Ribbesford is a village and civil parish in the Wyre Forest District of Worcestershire, England.  At the 2001 census it had a population of 237.

History

Ribbesford was in the lower division of Doddingtree Hundred.

References

External links 
 
 

Villages in Worcestershire